The Museum of Deaf History, Arts and Culture is a museum dedicated to the unique culture of Deaf and hard of hearing people in the United States. The museum opened in 2001 in Olathe, Kansas, across the street from the Kansas School for the Deaf.

Mission

The museum's mission statement reads: "The Museum of Deaf History, Arts & Culture (MDHAC) will advance and preserve knowledge about Deaf people, their languages, cultures, and experiences in the United States and around the world." The organization aims to educate the public about the unique heritage and diversity of the deaf community.

History and location

A museum collection named after William J. Marra, a long-time teacher at the Kansas School for the Deaf, was dedicated at the school in September 1986. Marra collected memorabilia from the school and other memorabilia of Deaf culture for over four decades. Marra's collection was first housed in the basement of the school's Robert Hall.

The idea for starting a deaf cultural center in Olathe began in 1988, after a new highway sign noting the location of the Kansas School for the Deaf was installed, leading to increased interest from passersby. The Kansas Educational Foundation incorporated in 1992 to fundraise and construct a building across the street from the Kansas School for the Deaf. Construction began in December 1995 and the building was opened on September 29, 2001; the first museum exhibit was created in 2005. The organization's name changed multiple times, beginning as the Kansas Educational Foundation, renamed to the Deaf Cultural Center Foundation in 2009, and renamed again in 2017 as the Museum of Deaf History, Arts & Culture, Inc.

In 2005 Marra's collection was moved across the street and became the William J. Marra Museum of Deaf History, which is now located within the Museum of Deaf History, Arts and Culture.

Exhibits and art gallery

The museum has created a series of exhibits focusing on specific aspects of Deaf culture and history. Ongoing exhibits include:
 Deaf History: an exploration of the history and culture of the Kansas School for the Deaf and broader American Deaf culture
 Deaf Culture: a journey through the experience of seeing the world through the Deaf worldview
 Luther "Dummy" Hoy: sharing the story of Dummy Taylor, a graduate of the Kansas School for the Deaf and pitcher for the New York Giants in the early 1900s
 A Different Way To Hear: a video presentation of Deaf history and culture
 Deaf Community Interviews: video memories of Kansas Deaf community members

Former exhibits have included displays on the LEAD-K Campaign, aimed at promoting language equity for deaf children, and information about deaf workers at the Hyer Boot Factory in Olathe.

The Museum of Deaf History, Arts and Culture is also home to the Chuck Baird Art Gallery. Painter Chuck Baird, a graduate of the Kansas School for the Deaf, was a proponent of the De'VIA genre for deaf artists. The museum is home to the Chuck Baird Foundation for the Visual Arts, which promotes and showcases artworks that convey the Deaf worldview and experience. The gallery includes an exhibit on the history of the De'VIA movement and an annual display of the Youth De'VIA Competition.

Programming

The museum features multiple events throughout the year. The cultural series features presentations related to Deaf history, arts and culture, along with hands-on immersive workshops introducing elementary school students to Deaf culture and sign language. Visual arts classes, performing arts performances, and American Sign Language classes are part of the organization's outreach efforts. In partnership with The Nelson-Atkins Museum of Art, the museum has coordinated multiple Deaf Cultural Day events, featuring art activities, American Sign Language poetry performances, and film screenings.

References

External links
 
 Museum of Deaf History, Arts & Culture in Olathe, Kansas 2-minute video from deaf travel blog Seek the World, in ASL with English captions (2018)

Deaf culture in the United States
Deafness organizations
History museums in Kansas